Laccospadicinae (formerly Linospadicinae) is a subtribe of plants in the family Arecaceae.

Genera:
Calyptrocalyx
Howea
Laccospadix
Linospadix

References

 
Arecaceae subtribes